

This is a list of the National Register of Historic Places listings in James City County, Virginia.

This is intended to be a complete list of the properties and districts on the National Register of Historic Places in James City County, Virginia, United States.  The locations of National Register properties and districts for which the latitude and longitude coordinates are included below, may be seen in an online map.

There are 19 properties and districts listed on the National Register in the county, including one National Historic Landmark.

Current listings

|}

See also

 List of National Historic Landmarks in Virginia
 National Register of Historic Places listings in Virginia
National Register of Historic Places listings in Williamsburg, Virginia

References

 
James City